In molecular biology, this protein domain has been termed SRA-YDG,  which is the abbreviation for SET and Ring finger Associated, YDG motif. Additional characteristics of the domain  include conservation of up to 13 evenly spaced glycine residues and a VRV(I/V)RG motif. The protein domain is mainly found in plants and animals and in bacteria.

Function
The function of this protein domain, in animals, is to aid progression through the cell cycle. This domain is associated with the Np95-like ring finger protein and the related gene product Np97, which contains PHD and RING FINGER domains; important in cell cycle progression. Np95 is a chromatin-associated ubiquitin ligase, binding to histones is direct and shows a remarkable preference for histone H3 and its N-terminal tail. The SRA-YDG domain contained in Np95 is needed for the interaction with histones and for chromatin binding in vivo.

In plants the SRA-YDG domain is associated with the SET domain, found in a family of histone methyl transferases, which switch genes "off" by adding a methyl group. In bacteria it is found in association with HNH, a non-specific nuclease motif.

Structure
This protein domain contains both alpha helices and beta sheets. In particular, the beta sheets are arranged in an antiparallel formation. More specifically, it contains a beta grasp fold.

References

Protein domains